is a Japanese footballer currently playing as a goalkeeper for Tokushima Vortis.

Career statistics

Club
.

Notes

References

External links

2002 births
Living people
Association football people from Tokushima Prefecture
Japanese footballers
Association football goalkeepers
Tokushima Vortis players